SK Neptun, Simklubben Neptun, Swedish swim team from Stockholm founded October 12, 1906 by members from Stockholms KK. Home pool is Eriksdalsbadet in Stockholm. The club practises swimming, diving, water polo, synchronized swimming and masters swimming.

Swimmers
Therese Alshammar (1993-1995, 1996-2008)
Jonas Andersson
Jane Cederqvist
Thor Henning
Mikaela Laurén
Stefan Nystrand (2006-)
Simon Sjödin (2007-)
Petter Stymne
Simon Frank

External links
SK Neptun's Official Homepage (In Swedish)

Swimming clubs in Sweden
Water polo clubs in Sweden
Sports clubs established in 1906
Sport in Stockholm
1906 establishments in Sweden